Faculta is a genus of moths in the family Gelechiidae.

Species
 Faculta inaequalis (Busck, 1910)
 Faculta synthetica (Walsingham, 1911)
 Faculta triangulella (Busck, 1907)

References

Gelechiini